Rugby sevens at the 2019 Pan American Games in Lima, Peru was held from July 26th to 28th. The venue for the competition is the rugby sevens stadium located at the Villa María del Triunfo cluster.

A total of eight men's and eight women's teams (each consisting up to 12 athletes) competed in each tournament. This means a total of 192 athletes were scheduled to compete. After making its debut at the 2015 edition, the women's tournament has been expanded to eight teams from six.

Medal table

Medalists

Participating nations
12 countries qualified rugby sevens teams . The numbers of participants qualified are in parentheses. Jamaica, Peru and Trinidad and Tobago are all scheduled to make their Pan American Games debut in the sport.

Qualification
Eight men's teams and eight women's teams qualified to compete at the games in each tournament. The host nation (Peru) received automatic qualification in the women's tournament only, along with seven other teams. Eight men's teams qualified through various tournaments as well.

Men

Women

See also
Rugby sevens at the 2020 Summer Olympics

References

External links
Results book

 
Rugby sevens
Rugby sevens
Rugby union in Peru
2019 rugby sevens competitions